Thümmlitzwalde is a village and a former municipality in the Leipzig district in Saxony, Germany. Since 1 January 2011, it is part of the town Grimma.

References 

Former municipalities in Saxony
Grimma